Lovie Yancey (January 3, 1912 – January 26, 2008), born in Bastrop, Texas, was the African-American founder of the Fatburger restaurant chain.

Founding of Fatburger
She originally owned a small restaurant in Tucson. In 1947, she founded Fatburger under its original name, Mr. Fatburger. In 1952, Yancey shed both her business partners and the "Mr." from the name of the hamburger stand, and Fatburger was officially born. From the beginning, Yancey was a fixture at the original Fatburger, where customers, who included entertainers such as Redd Foxx and Ray Charles, could custom-order their burgers. Yancey always claimed, "I don't worry about McDonald's, Burger King, or Wendy's. They may be more popular, but a good hamburger sells itself, and I don't think anybody makes as good a hamburger as we do."

Yancey sold her Fatburger company to an investment group in 1990, but retained control of the original property on Western Avenue. She established a $1.7-million endowment at City of Hope National Medical Center in Duarte in 1986 for research into sickle-cell anemia. This was in fulfillment of a promise to her 22-year-old grandson, Duran Farrell, who had died of the disease three years earlier.

Death

On January 26, 2008, Yancey died of pneumonia. In addition to her daughter, Yancey was survived by three grandchildren and five great-grandchildren.

References

1912 births
2008 deaths
American food company founders
Fast-food chain founders
Deaths from pneumonia in California
American women company founders
American company founders
American women restaurateurs
American restaurateurs
20th-century American businesspeople
People from Bastrop, Texas
20th-century American businesswomen
21st-century American women